Jesus Songs is a 2004 mini-album by British group The Broken Family Band. The songs have a unifying theme in Jesus Christ, though the band themselves are not Christians.
Lead singer Steve Adams told Songfacts that he wrote "Poor Little Thing," "thinking it was about my twin sister, and then I ended up realizing it was about me."

Track listing
Walking Back To Jesus Part One
Mother O'JesusMother of Jesus

The King Of Carrot Flowers Parts Two & Three (Neutral Milk Hotel)
Walking Back To Jesus Part Two
Poor Little Thing
Kissing In The Rain
Walking Back To Jesus Part Three

All songs by Adams/Broken Family Band, except where noted.

Credits
 Steven Adams - guitar, vocals
 Gavin Johnson - bass guitar
 Micky Roman - drums
 Jay Williams - guitar
 Timothy Victor - banjo, vocals
 Gill Sandell - piano-keyed accordion
 Inge Thomson - singing
 Anglia Voices - singing

References

2004 EPs
The Broken Family Band albums